Tan Anthony Lin is an American poet, author, filmmaker, and professor. He defines his work as “ambient" literature, which draws on and samples source material from the Internet and popular culture to address issues involving plagiarism, copyright, and technology.

Early life and education

Lin was born April 24, 1957 in Seattle, Washington, to Chinese-American immigrants born in Shanghai, China, and Beijing, China. His parents migrated to the United States from China, his father in 1948 and his mother in 1949. His father, Henry Huan Lin, was a ceramist and former dean of the Ohio University College of Fine Arts. His mother, Julia Chang Lin, born in Shanghai, was a poet and taught literature at Ohio University. Tan Lin is the nephew of Lin Huiyin, who is said to be the first female architect in China. Lin Juemin and Lin Yin Ming, both among the 72 martyrs of the Second Guangzhou Uprising, were cousins of his grandfather. Lin Chang-min, a Hanlin of Qing dynasty, the emperor's teacher, was the father of Lin Hui-yin and grandfather of Tan. 

The Lin family moved to Athens, Ohio, where in 1959, Tan's sister, Maya Ying Lin, was born. She is an American designer and artist who designed the Vietnam Veterans Memorial in Washington, D.C.

Lin received a Bachelor of Arts in English from Carleton College in Northfield, Minnesota. He received M.A. and Ph.D. degrees in English Literature from Columbia University in New York City. In addition to writing essays, poems, and books, Lin currently teaches creative writing at Columbia University and New Jersey City University.  He has previously taught at the University of Virginia, the California Institute of the Arts, and Brooklyn College.

Works

Lin's style as an artist comes from the principle of "ambient" literature. A commentary by Katherine Elaine Sanders described the style by saying, "Lin leads his audiences in exploring the temporary ephemera that fills our daily interactions: emails, Twitter feeds, Facebook messages, blogs, movies, magazines, and advertisements, indexes, photographs, and recipes." 

The first published work by Lin was Lotion Bullwhip Giraffe in 1996, a "meditation backwards," where he invented new poetry structures through the manipulation of the mechanics of language. In 2003, Lin published his second work, Blipsoak01, where he again used inventive poetry structures, this time through the abstract visual placement of words. In ambience is a novel with a logo, Lin used a subtitle system consisting of citations in the format of Google search entries. Less than a year later, he published HEATH, which utilized the same subtitle system presented in ambience, but also focused on language and graphics from various online sources. In 2010, Lin published 7 Controlled Vocabularies and Obituary 2004: The Joy of Cooking, in which he continued his use of inventive poetry structures, this time in the style of "a field guide to the arts." Most recently, in 2011, he published Insomnia and the Aunt, in which he mourned the death of his aunt, who owned a motel.

HEATH 

In the project HEATH (Plagiarism/Outsource), Lin presented a collection of language and graphics compiled from a variety of online sources, ranging from advertisements to Facebook to scholarly articles. For Lin, the work touched on "who is more generally responsible for certain texts", rather "who physically authors a text." He explored the idea of an ambient novel by highlighting how a book works and how a reader reacts to a printed object when the content itself is arguably meaningless. The content skips from subject to subject in a seemingly random way through plagiarisms, outsourced material, and meta-content.

7 Controlled Vocabularies and Obituary 2004: The Joy of Cooking 

In 7 Controlled Vocabularies and Obituary 2004: The Joy of Cooking, Lin wrote prose poems that are disrupted by themselves, alluding to the idea of art being "relaxingly meaningless." He distorted the line between various aesthetic disciplines and took avant-garde notions to a new level by diffusing them into ambient formats such as yoga and meditation. The seven sections of the book each address a different art form, including photography, painting, the novel, architecture, music, theory, and film, using both text and photographs.

The critical response to 7 Controlled Vocabularies and Obituary 2004: The Joy of Cooking was generally positive. The poet Kenneth Goldsmith wrote, "Lin proposes a radical idea for reading: not reading. Words, so prevalent today, are merely elements that constitute fleeting engagements." 

The work was the winner of a Book Award for poetry in 2012 from the Association for Asian American Studies.

Bibliography

Essays 

 Information Archives, the De-Materialization of Language, and Kenneth Goldsmith's Fidget and No. 111 2.7.93-10.20.96
 Anachronistic Modernism, Cabinet, Winter 2000/2001
 Warhol's Aura and the Language of Writing, Cabinet, Fall 2001
 Boredom and Nonsense in Wonderland, Introduction, Notes, and For Further Reading, Alice's Adventures in Wonderland and Through the Looking Glass, Barnes and Noble Classics, 2004
 Eric Baudelaire's Sugar Water, the Deleuzean Event, and the Dispersion of Spectatorial Labour, Reading Room, February 2008
 Disco as Operating System, Part 1, Criticism, Winter 2008
 PLAGIARISM: A response to Thomas Fink, Otoliths, June 2009

Published works 

 Lotion Bullwhip Giraffe, 1996
 BlipSoak01, 2003
 ambience is a novel with logo, 2007
 Kruder & Dorfmeister, 2007
 Heath (Plagiarism/Outsource), 2007
 7 Controlled Vocabularies and Obituary 2004: The Joy of Cooking, 2010
 Blurb, 2010
 Purple/Pink Appendix, 2010
 Bib., Rev. Ed., 2011
 Insomnia and the Aunt, 2011

Art exhibitions 

 Automasters, 1999
 Poetry Plastique, 2001
 Between Language and Form, 2002
 27 Merging Artists, 2002
 One Place and the Other, 2002
 Code Residue, 2005
 The Baghdad Batteries, 2010
 The Evryali Score, 2010

Public art projects 

 Itinerant Gastronomy, 1996
 The Echo Variations, The Edge of Summer Cleans Autumn, 1998
 Cleveland Public Library Project, 1998
 "Flatness", 2001
 Input, 2004
 Chinese Chalk in a Parking Lot, 2009
 TwitterChalk, 2009

Film, theatre, and video works 

 Calendar the Siamese, 1996
 Poetry in Uniforms, 1996
 Dub Version, 2002
 Eleven Minute Painting, Reading Module v. 01, 2002
 Poni Hoax, 2005
 Disco Eats Itself, 2007

Awards 

 Danforth Foundation Nominee, 1979
 Mademoiselle Poetry Prize, 1979
 Gertrude Stein Award for Innovative American Poetry, 1984 and 1986
 Bennett Cerf Award, Columbia University, 1985
 Van Rensselaer Award for Poetry, 1986
 Academy of American Poets Honorable Mention, Columbia University, 1987
 President's Fellow, Columbia University, 1990
 The Pushcart Prizes, Honorable Mention for Fiction, 2004
 J. Paul Getty Visiting Scholar Fellowship, The Getty Trust, Los Angeles, 2004
 Asian American Arts Alliance Urban Artist/Initiative/NYC Grant, 2006-2007
 Andy Warhol Foundation/Creative Capital Arts Writing Grant, 2006-2007
 Foundation for Contemporary Arts Grants to Artists award (2012)
 Creative Capital Award (2022)

References

1954 births
Living people
Writers from Seattle
Carleton College alumni
Brooklyn College faculty